Pilgrim Lutheran Church for the Deaf of Greater Kansas City and Parsonage is a historic site at 3801-3807 Gilham Road in 
Kansas City, Missouri.

It was built in 1941 and added to the National Register of Historic Places in 2001.

References

Churches for the deaf
Lutheran churches in Missouri
National Register of Historic Places in Kansas City, Missouri
Gothic Revival church buildings in Missouri
Churches completed in 1941
Churches in Kansas City, Missouri